Alokananda Dasgupta is a contemporary music composer. She was pursuing her Masters in English Literature at Calcutta University when she decided to pursue her lifelong passion for music in Toronto, where she completed a Bachelors of Music with Honors in Theory and Composition at York University. She has previously assisted Amit Trivedi on films like Udaan (2010), Aisha (2010), No One Killed Jessica (2011) and Chillar Party (2011). 

She debuted as a music composer with the Marathi drama film Shala (2011). She also composed the score of B.A. Pass (2013), Fandry (2013), Anwar Ka Ajab Kissa (2013), Asha Jaoar Majhe (2014) and Trapped (2017). 

She most recently composed the background scores for the first seasons of Amazon Prime’s  Breathe and Netflix’s Sacred Games. She is presently working on a feature film, the second season of Sacred Games. , as well as the first season of Netflix’s dystopian thriller, Leila.

Early life and career
Alokananda is the daughter of famous poet and film maker Buddhadeb Dasgupta. She has an elder sister. She did her graduation with Honors in English Literature from St. Xavier's College, Kolkata. She also did her master's course in English Literature at University of Calcutta. She studied Film Studies for two years at St. Xavier's College, Kolkata and then went to the York University, Toronto where she completed her bachelor's degree in Music Performance and Music Composition. After the completion of her course, Alokananda became the music assistant of Amit Trivedi for films like Udan (2010), Aisha (2010), No One Killed Jessica (2011) and Chillar Party (2011).

Discography
 
| Breathe: Into the Shadows 2 || 2022 || TV series

References

External links
 

Living people
Bengali musicians
Indian film score composers
York University alumni
Indian pianists
Musicians from Kolkata
21st-century pianists
Year of birth missing (living people)